The Government of India recognises six languages as the Classical languages of India. In 2004, the Government of India declared that languages that met certain strict criteria could be accorded the status of a "Classical Language" of India. It was instituted by the Ministry of Culture along with the Linguistic Experts' Committee. The committee was constituted by the Government of India to consider demands for categorization of languages as Classical Languages.

Classical languages
The list shows the languages which have been declared to be Classical:

Criteria
In the year 2004, the tentative criteria for the age of antiquity of "classical language" was assumed to be at least 1000 years of existence.

In a 2006 press release, Minister of Tourism and Culture Ambika Soni told the Rajya Sabha the following criteria were laid down to determine the eligibility of languages to be considered for classification as a "Classical Language",

Benefits
As per Government of India's Resolution No. 2-16/2004-US (Akademies) dated 1 November 2004, the benefits that will accrue to a language declared as a "Classical Language" are:

 Two major international awards for scholars of eminence in Classical Indian Languages are awarded annually.
 A Centre of Excellence for Studies in Classical Languages is set up.
 The University Grants Commission will be requested to create, to start with at least in the Central Universities, a certain number of Professional Chairs for Classical Languages for scholars of eminence in Classical Indian Languages.

Demands for other languages

Over the next few years, demands have been made for other languages to be accorded Classical status, including Pali, Bengali, Marathi and Meitei (officially called Manipuri).

See also 
 Indian classical dance
 Indian classical music

References

 
Classical Language in India